Enter the Danger Brigade is the debut album from Indiana Christian rock band Calibretto 13. It was released on 24 October 2000. All songs on the album were written by Calibretto 13, except for "The Ballroom Blitz" which is a cover of the song by Sweet.

Track listing
 "High 5"
 "Spoiled Brat"
 "The Ballroom Blitz"
 "Fall Away"
 "Movie Star"
 "Christian Hate Mail"
 "The Apple Song"
 "Get A Life"
 "Goodbye Cruel World"
 "Soul Stalker"
 "Creep"

Personnel
 Aaron Richardson - Bass, Backing Vocals
 Christopher Thomas - Drums, Percussion, Backing Vocals
 Joe Whiteford - Vocals, Guitars

References

Calibretto 13 albums
2000 debut albums
Tooth & Nail Records albums